Mourad Marofit (born January 26, 1982, in Khemisset) is a Moroccan long-distance runner. He set his personal best time of 13:02.84, by winning the men's 5000 metres at the KBC Night of Athletics in Heusden-Zolder, Belgium.

Marofit represented Morocco at the 2008 Summer Olympics in Beijing, where he competed for the men's 5,000 metres. He ran in the second heat against thirteen other athletes, including Kenya's Edwin Cheruiyot Soi, who later won the bronze medal in the final. He finished the race in eighth place by five seconds behind New Zealand's Adrian Blincoe, with a time of 14:00.76. Marofit, however, failed to advance into the final, as he placed thirtieth overall, and was ranked farther below four mandatory slots for the next round.

References

External links

NBC 2008 Olympics profile

Moroccan male long-distance runners
Living people
Olympic athletes of Morocco
Athletes (track and field) at the 2008 Summer Olympics
People from Khemisset
1982 births